ACDC may refer to:

 AC/DC, an Australian rock music group
 ACDC (medicine), Arterial calcification due to deficiency of CD73 (ACDC), a rare genetic disorder
 Adiponectin, a peptide hormone
 All Campus Dining Center, a dining hall at Vassar College
 Asian Community Development Corporation, a community development organization headquartered in Boston
 abbreviation for, Atlanta City Detention Center
 ACDC (JoJo's Bizarre Adventure), also Esidisi, a character from the Japanese manga and anime JoJo's Bizarre Adventure in the story arc Battle Tendency
 ACDC, a dance crew led by Adam G. Sevani and Jon M. Chu
 Africa CDC, Africa Centres for Disease Control and Prevention
 ACDC, Asymmetric counteranion directed catalysis or chiral anion catalysis

See also 

 
 
 AC/DC (disambiguation)
 ACDC domain, AP2-Coincident Domain mainly at the Carboxy-terminus, a protein domain found in malaria parasites and its evolutionary relatives
 ACDC Lane, a street in Melbourne named after the band AC/DC
 ACDSee, a shareware image viewer program
 Alternating current (AC) electricity
 Direct current (DC) electricity